The Suzuki R engine is an inline-three engine that has been produced by Suzuki since 2011. Initially introduced in the third-generation MR Wagon, and intended as a replacement for the K6A engine, the R engine has since been used in various Suzuki's, such as the Alto, the Wagon R, and the Carry.

Overview
For the release of the third-generation MR Wagon in 2011, Suzuki introduced a brand-new  inline-three petrol engine. The new engine, known as the R06A, was available in naturally-aspirated and turbocharged forms, which produced  respectively. Introduced as a replacement to the K6A that had been in production since 1994, the R06A features four valves per cylinder (for a total of 12), dual overhead camshafts, with a bore and stroke of  respectively. In addition, the size and weight of the engine were reduced by adopting a cylinder head integrated into the exhaust manifold and a simpler catalyst case structure. While this is good for fuel economy and emissions, the exhaust is more restricted which lowers horsepower and power potential. The naturally-aspirated versions of the R06A feature variable valve timing (VVT) on both the intake and exhaust valves (the first Suzuki engine to do so), and VVT on the intake valves of the turbocharged models.

For 2012, Suzuki added the naturally-aspirated version of the engine to the Alto's range, with R06A-equipped Altos being called the Alto Eco. The Wagon R also received both forms of the R06A engine in 2012, to coincide with the release of the fifth-generation model. In 2013, the R06A was used for the new Suzuki Spacia and the updated Suzuki Carry, and in 2014, it was used for the new Suzuki Hustler. The Carry was the first vehicle to use the R06A engine in a rear-wheel-drive configuration, and had a slightly detuned  version of the engine.

In December 2019, Suzuki introduced a brand new R engine for the 2020 model Suzuki Wagon R and second-generation Suzuki Hustler. It's a naturally aspirated  inline-three petrol engine, known as the R06D. Only available in naturally-aspirated  form and produced .

R06A
The R06A is a 658 cc inline three DOHC 12 valve engine with VVT. Available in naturally aspirated or turbocharged. Bore x stroke is 64.0mm x 68.2mm. Compression ratios are 1:9.1 (turbo) and 1:11.0-11.5 (NA).
Output is between 49-54 PS @5700-6500 rpm with 58-63 N.m of torque @3500-4000 rpm (NA) and 64 PS @6000 rpm with 95-100 N.m @3000 rpm of torque (turbo).
R06A can come paired with Suzuki's mild hybrid system, with the W05A electric motor (3.1 PS and 50 Nm) and a 10Ah battery.

Applications
Naturally-aspirated
2011–2016: Suzuki MR Wagon/Nissan Moco
2012–2020: Suzuki Wagon R/Mazda Flair
2012–present: Suzuki Alto/Mazda Carol
2013–present: Suzuki Carry/Mazda Scrum/Nissan NT100 Clipper/Mitsubishi Minicab
2013–present: Suzuki Spacia/Mazda Flair Wagon
2014–2020: Suzuki Hustler/Mazda Flair Crossover
2015–present: Suzuki Every/Mazda Scrum/Nissan NV100 Clipper/Mitsubishi Minicab

Turbocharged
2011–2016: Suzuki MR Wagon/Nissan Moco
2012–present: Suzuki Wagon R/Mazda Flair
2013–present: Suzuki Spacia/Mazda Flair Wagon
2014–2021: Suzuki Alto/Mazda Carol
2014–present: Suzuki Hustler/Mazda Flair Crossover
2015–present: Suzuki Every/Mazda Scrum/Nissan NV100 Clipper/Mitsubishi Minicab/Mitsubishi Town Box
2018–present: Suzuki Jimny
2021–present Caterham Seven 170 (tuned to 85 PS & 116 Nm)

R06D
The R06D is a naturally aspirated 657 cc inline three DOHC 12 valve engine with VVT. Bore x stroke is 61.5mm x 73.8mm. Compression ratio is 1:12.0.
Output is 49 PS @6500 rpm with 58 N.m of torque @5000 rpm.
This engine can also come in a mild hybrid configuration, but with the slightly less powerful W04C electric motor (2.6 PS and 40 N.m) and a lower capacity 3Ah battery.

Applications
2020–present: Suzuki Hustler/Mazda Flair Crossover
2020–present: Suzuki Wagon R/Mazda Flair
2021–present: Suzuki Alto Hybrid
2021–present: Suzuki Wagon R Smile

References

Suzuki engines
Straight-three engines